Gossip Girl is an American teen drama streaming television series developed by Joshua Safran for HBO Max. It is an extension and a standalone sequel to The CW television series of the same name, which is based on the novel series written by Cecily von Ziegesar. The series is executive produced by original series co-creators Josh Schwartz and Stephanie Savage, along with Safran, who was an executive producer on the first series and who also serves as showrunner. The series is narrated by Kristen Bell, who reprised her role as the voice of Gossip Girl, an anonymous and omniscient blogger. The series features an ensemble cast led by Jordan Alexander, Whitney Peak, Tavi Gevinson, Eli Brown, Thomas Doherty, Emily Alyn Lind, Evan Mock, Zión Moreno, Savannah Lee Smith, and Grace Duah.

It was given a straight-to-series order in July 2019 by HBO Max. Filming takes place in New York City and was originally scheduled to begin in March 2020 before being delayed until November 2020 due to the COVID-19 pandemic.

Gossip Girl premiered on HBO Max on July 8, 2021, to mixed reviews and broke the record for the most-watched HBO Max original series over its launch weekend. The first season consisted of 12 episodes, split into two six-episode parts, with the second half debuting on November 25, 2021. In September 2021, the series was renewed for a second season, which premiered on December 1, 2022. In January 2023, the series was cancelled after two seasons.

Premise
Nearly a decade after the conclusion of the original series, a new cast of Manhattan private schoolers takes the lead under the watchful eye of Gossip Girl, while demonstrating how much social media – and the landscape of New York City itself – has changed in the intervening years. Gossip Girl is slated to feature more adult content than the original on The CW, owing to the relaxed standards of the HBO Max streaming service. The series is also slated to be more diverse, with non-white leads and LGBT characters.

In regard to continuity, executive producer and showrunner Joshua Safran stated that it is officially in the same continuity of the original Gossip Girl series. However, rather than a direct continuation of the story, it is instead set in the same world where previous characters existed and can be freely referenced and potentially reappear, but stars a different set of characters from a different point of view.

Cast and characters

Main

 Jordan Alexander as Julien Calloway, an influencer and it girl who goes to Constance Billard as the queen bee. At the beginning of the series, she's dating Obie and is recently united with her half-sister, Zoya.
Whitney Peak as Zoya Lott, a morally-upstanding scholarship freshman at Constance Billard who moved to Manhattan on her half-sister's request. She later forms a relationship with Obie.
 Tavi Gevinson as Kate Keller, an English teacher at Constance Billard who, tired of being bullied by her students, leads a ring of teachers as "Gossip Girl"
 Eli Brown as Otto "Obie" Bergmann IV, an extremely wealthy do-gooder who is considered a guilty rich. He forms a relationship with Zoya after his break up with Julien.
 Thomas Doherty as Max Wolfe, a pansexual and headstrong flirt who has feelings for both Aki and Audrey
 Emily Alyn Lind as Audrey Hope, a dismissive teenager and avid literature reader who is Julien's best friend and Aki's girlfriend with an interest in Max
 Evan Mock as Akeno "Aki" Menzies, a bisexual skateboarder and movie enthusiast who is Obie's best friend and Audrey's boyfriend with an interest in Max
 Johnathan Fernandez as Nick Lott, Zoya's caring father who is a lawyer
 Adam Chanler-Berat as Jordan Glassberg, a Computer Science teacher at Constance Billard who helps run the Gossip Girl account. He is interested in Kate.
 Zión Moreno as Luna La, a transgender trendsetter who serves as Julien's stylist and friend
 Savannah Lee Smith as Monet de Haan, the intimidating and powerful friend to Julien and Luna who serves as the former's PR representative
 Jason Gotay as Rafa Caparros (season 1), a gay Classics teacher at Constance Billard who sexually preys on his students
 Todd Almond as Gideon Wolfe, Max's father and a theater impresario
 Laura Benanti as Kiki Hope, an athleisure wear designer and Audrey's alcoholic mother. She has a complicated relationship with her daughter following her divorce after her husband's cheating.
 Grace Duah as Shan Barnes (season 2; guest season 1), Zoya's new best friend
 Megan Ferguson as Wendy (season 2; recurring season 1), an administration staff at Constance Billard with a strong knowledge of the original Gossip Girl blog who goes on to help Kate and Jordan run the new Gossip Girl account

The series is narrated by Kristen Bell as the voice of "Gossip Girl", an online anonymous figure, reprising her role from the 2007 series.

Recurring

 John Benjamin Hickey as Roy Sachs, Max's father who works as a landscaper
 Carla Hall as Rocky
 Donna Murphy as Vivian Burton, the Headmistress of Constance Billard
 Luke Kirby as Davis Calloway, Julien's music mogul father and Lola's ex-fiancé 
 Elizabeth Lail as Lola Morgan (season 1), a singer-songwriter and Davis Calloway's ex-fiancée
 Ella Rubin as Bianca Breer, Julien's rival from another school 
 Katherine Reis as Pippa Sykes, Bianca's best friend
 Lyne Renée as Helena Bergmann, Obie's mother who is an extremely wealthy real estate mogul
 Malcolm McDowell as Roger Menzies, father of Aki, Jake, Hamish, and Eliza as well as Jodi's ex-husband who is a widely-known media tycoon
 Edmund Donovan as Scott, a teacher from another school who's involved in "Gossip Girl"
 Angelic Zambrana as Tati
 Cole Doman as Rex Huntington
 Kathryn Gallagher as Heidi Bergmann, Obie's sister who took Max's virginity
 Amanda Warren as Camille de Haan, Monet's mother and a powerful biotechnologist billionaire
 Anna van Patten as Grace Byron, the daughter of Virginia state senator, Charlotte Byron and Obie's new girlfriend
 Pico Alexander as Mike Shubin (season 2), a teacher at Constance Billard who just returned from a long sabbatical 
 Rick Worthy as Greyson de Haan (season 2), Monet's father 
 Jarvis Tomdio as Graham (season 2), Julien's love interest

Guest
 Jeremy O. Harris as himself (season 1)
 Princess Nokia as herself (season 1)
 Billy Porter as himself (season 1)
 Marc Shaiman as himself (season 1)
 Hettienne Park as Jodie Menzies (season 1), former wife of Roger and Aki's biological mother
 Lucy Punch as Saskia Bates (season 1), Max's surrogate mother and an actress
 Elizabeth Stanley as Charlotte Byron (season 2), Grace's mother and a controversial senator
 Charli XCX as herself (season 2)
 Andy Cohen as himself (season 2)
 LaChanze as Mimi (season 2), Julien and Zoya’s aunt
 Lukas Gage as himself (season 2)

Guest characters from Gossip Girl (2007) 
 Azhy Robertson as Milo Sparks (season 1), Georgina Sparks's son who helps Zoya get revenge on Julien. This character was introduced in the 2007 series played by uncredited child actors.
 Yin Chang as Nelly Yuki, a high-ranking employee at a magazine company and a former member of Blair Waldorf's clique
 Zuzanna Szadkowski as Dorota Kishlovsky (season 1), the Waldorfs' Polish housekeeper
 Wallace Shawn as Cyrus Rose (season 1), Gideon's lawyer and Blair Waldorf's stepfather
 Margaret Colin as Eleanor Waldorf-Rose, a former fashion designer and Blair Waldorf's mother
 Aaron Schwartz as Vanya (season 1), Dorota's husband and former doorman of the van der Woodsens' apartment
 Michelle Trachtenberg as Georgina Sparks (season 2), a manipulative socialite who blackmail Kate.
 Matt Doyle as Jonathan Whitney (season 2), Eric van der Woodsen's husband

Episodes

Series overview

Season 1 (2021)

Season 2 (2022–23)

Production

Development
WarnerMedia ordered a revival of the series for HBO Max in July 2019. Although called a "reboot", it was confirmed to be a continuation of the original story by Josh Schwartz. On November 2, 2020, it was announced that Karena Evans would direct the first two episodes of the series. On September 9, 2021, HBO Max renewed the series for a second season. On January 19, 2023, the series was cancelled after two seasons.

Writing
The creator and executive producer of the sequel, Safran, says that his priorities for the series are "to focus on stories that are not limited to one demographic.". He also stated "I wanted to be more inclusive; I wanted to showcase a more diverse universe; I wanted to tell more queer stories.".

Casting
In November 2019, it was announced Bell would be returning as the voice of Gossip Girl in the new series. In March 2020, it was reported Alyn Lind, Peak, Brown, Fernandez and Gotay were cast. Later that month, Gevinson, Doherty, Chanler-Berat and Moreno were reported to have joined as well. In April 2020, it was reported Smith had joined the cast. In August 2020, Jordan Alexander joined the cast in a starring role. In October 2020, Evan Mock was cast as a series regular, while Benanti was cast in an undisclosed capacity. In March 2021, Lail joined the cast in an undisclosed role. In May 2021, Renée joined the cast in a recurring role. In June 2021, Ferguson and Harris joined the cast in an undisclosed capacities. In June 2022, Michelle Trachtenberg is set to reprise her role from the original series as Georgina Sparks in an undisclosed capacity for the second season. In October 2022, it was announced that Grace Duah has been promoted to series regular for the second season.

Filming
Filming for the series was scheduled to begin in March 2020 in New York City but was put on hold due to the impact of the COVID-19 pandemic in the United States, and as a result, the release date was pushed back to 2021. Production for the series began on November 2, 2020.

Filming for the second season began on February 4, 2022 in New York City. The series was also shot in Rome, Italy, in August 2022.

Release
Gossip Girl premiered on HBO Max on July 8, 2021. The first six episodes of the series aired weekly, while the second slate of six episodes was released on November 25, 2021. The first season finale was released on December 2, 2021. In June 2021, it was announced that The CW would broadcast the first episode of the sequel on July 9, the day after it premieres on the streaming service, with the episode available to stream on The CW's online platforms after its broadcast. The second season premiered on December 1, 2022.

The series is available to watch in Asia via HBO Go. The series was acquired by BBC One and BBC iPlayer for the United Kingdom. For Canada, it was acquired by Crave. In Belgium, the series was released on Streamz on July 9, 2021. The series was released on Amazon Prime Video India on July 21, 2022.

Reception

On Rotten Tomatoes, the first season holds an approval rating of 38% based on 56 critic reviews, with an average rating of 4.9/10. The website's critical consensus reads, "An ambitious misfire, Gossip Girl stutters more than it struts, stranding a stacked cast in a sumptuous sea of rudderless drama." On Metacritic, the first season has a weighted average score of 51 out of 100, based on 29 critics, indicating "mixed or average reviews".

On Rotten Tomatoes, the second season has an approval rating of 90% based on 10 critic reviews, with an average rating of 7.1/10. On Metacritic, the second season holds a weighted average score of 68 out of 100, based on 5 critics, indicating "generally favorable reviews".

According to Samba TV, 550,000 US households watched the new series in its first four day streaming on HBO Max.

Notes

References

External links
 
 

Gossip Girl
2020s American high school television series
2020s American LGBT-related drama television series
2020s American teen drama television series
2021 American television series debuts
2023 American television series endings
American sequel television series
Bisexuality-related television series
English-language television shows
Fashion-themed television series
Gay-related television shows
HBO Max original programming
Lesbian-related television shows
Mass media portrayals of the upper class
Serial drama television series
Television productions postponed due to the COVID-19 pandemic
Television series about bullying
Television series about educators
Television series about social media
Television series about teenagers
Television series by Alloy Entertainment
Television series by CBS Studios
Television series by Warner Bros. Television Studios
Television shows based on American novels
Television shows filmed in New York City
Television shows set in Manhattan